K24HH-D, virtual and UHF digital channel 24, is a low-powered, Class A FamilyNet/Worship Network-affiliated television station licensed to Wichita Falls, Texas, United States. Founded on January 29, 1992, the station is owned by Christian Family Network TV. The station is relayed on Wichita Falls on K20DN-D (channel 20).

History

The station previously broadcast in analog as K30DJ on channel 30; however, the station would move to K24HH-D, which was on a newly created license. K30DJ's license was cancelled and its call sign was deleted from the Federal Communications Commission's database on May 22, 2012.

External links 
CFNT official site

24HH-D
Television channels and stations established in 1992
Low-power television stations in the United States
1992 establishments in Texas
Religious television stations in the United States